HM Prison Woodhill is a Category A male prison, located in Milton Keynes, England. Woodhill Prison is operated by His Majesty's Prison Service. A section of the prison is designated as a Young Offenders Institution. A Secure Training Centre is located next to the prison.

One of its main roles is that of a local prison serving the a Crown Court centre and magistrates' courts. The prison holds remand and sentenced prisoners aged 18 and above. In addition, Woodhill is one of the eight national high-security prisons, holding Category A prisoners, some in the Close Supervision Centre.

History
Woodhill Prison opened in 1992, with a further unit added to the complex in 1996. In 1998, one wing of the prison was re-designated as a Close Supervision Centre for prisoners who are amongst the most difficult and disruptive in the prison system. Two years later, an inspection report from Her Majesty's Chief Inspector of Prisons criticised conditions in the Close Supervision Centre, stating that inmates being held there were being deprived of mental stimulation and human contact.

Inspections
A further inspection report in February 2003, stated that there were too few prison staff at Woodhill. The report also highlighted the prison's suicide monitoring as an area that needed improvement. However the staff at the prison were praised for maintaining a positive attitude.

In February 2006, another inspection report from the Chief Inspector of Prisons criticised Woodhill Prison for poorly supporting at-risk prisoners and failing to bring in anti-bullying measures. The report also stated that staff in charge of youths held in the prison had not been trained or vetted to work with them.

The prison today
Woodhill is a category A prison for male adults, with an adjacent unit for young offenders. The prison holds both convicted prisoners and remand prisoners for local magistrate courts along with foreign nationals awaiting deportation.

The regime at Woodhill includes full-time and part-time classes. Other features include a job club, and listener schemes. Woodhill also has a multi-faith full-time chaplaincy. There is a visitor's centre at the prison, run by the Prison Advice and Care Trust.

Dr Elizabeth van Horn, an experienced prison psychiatrist left her job at Woodhill and alleged that staff shortages prevented change.  The courts, the Prisons and Probation Ombudsman and the prison's independent monitoring board all expressed concerns over regular understaffing, too much reliance on agency and temporary staff, assaults on both staff and inmates have also risen in the last few years as have suicides see below.  Van Horn claimed no real changes happened despite promises management made, they knew what needed to be done but did not know how to achieve improvements.  Staff shortages meant prisoners were often locked in their cells for 23 hours a day which added to stress for prisoners with mental health issues.

Suicides
There have been seventeen suicides at Woodhill Prison since 2013.  This is the highest suicide rate of any prison in the UK.  Staff shortages and the complexity of the prison are blamed.  
Woodhill’s Independent Monitoring Board had warned over “significant problems” in the prison, due to “serious staff shortages” and “increased use of new psychoactive drugs”, which made prisoners inclined to violence and self-harm. Coroners’ reports have noted the jail repeatedly failed to meet requirements of national policy on suicide and emergency response.

References

External links
 Ministry of Justice page for Woodhill

1992 establishments in England
Buildings and structures in Milton Keynes
Category A prisons in England
Prisons in Buckinghamshire